is a Japanese YouTuber, tarento and fashion model who is a former member of the Japanese idol girl group NMB48.

She is affiliated with Showtitle. During her time at NMB48, she was affiliated with Yoshimoto Kogyo.

Biography 
Yoshida passed NMB48's 1st generation auditions in September 2010. Her audition song was Tomorrow by Okamoto Mayo. Her debut was on October 9, 2010. Her stage debut was on January 1, 2011. In March 2011, she was selected to Team N. Her first NMB48 Senbatsu was the single Zetsumetsu Kurokami Shōjo.

In September 2011, Yoshida was suspended from activities due to a scandal. Her activities resumed in February 2012.

In the 2013 general elections, Yoshida ranked for the first time, placing 50th with 14,684 votes. In 2014, her ranked dropped and she placed 72nd with 10,982 votes.

On February 2, 2016, she opened her YouTube channel and became active as a YouTuber.

In the 2017 general elections, Yoshida placed 16th with 35,540 votes and entered the Senbatsu in AKB48 49th single.

In 2018, she became the model for women's fashion magazine Ray issued by Shufonotomo.

On August 16, 2020, her 24th birthday, she announced that she will be graduating from NMB48 during an event at the NMB48 theater. Her graduation concert, "Sayonara Pink, Sayonara Idol", was held at the Osaka-jō Hall on October 24. During that event, Yoshida announced that she is writing a memoir about her 10 years in NMB48. She was supposed to graduate from NMB48 on November 30, but that event was suspended due to her poor health, though she tested negative for COVID-19. The graduation performance was eventually rescheduled to December 21.

On January 16, 2021, Yoshida opened her official fan club, .

Discography

NMB48 singles

NMB48 Albums
 Teppen Tottande!
 "Teppen Tottande!"
 "12/31"
 "Lily" / Team N

 Sekai no Chuushin wa Osaka ya ~Namba Jichiku~
 "Ibiza girl"
 ""Seito Techo no Shashin wa Ki ni Haittenai" no Hoshoku"
 "Densha wo Oriru" / Team N

 Namba Ai (Ima, Omou Koto)
 "Masaka Singapore"
 "Namba Ai"

AKB48 singles

AKB48 Albums
 Koko ni Ita Koto
 "Koko ni Ita Koto"

 1830m
 "Aozora yo Sabishikunai Ka?"

 Koko ga Rhodes da, Koko de Tobe!
 "Bokutachi no Ideology"

 Bokutachi wa, Ano Hi no Yoake wo Shitteiru
 "Tengoku no Kakurega"

External links

References

1996 births
Living people
Japanese idols
Japanese women pop singers
People from Osaka Prefecture
Musicians from Osaka Prefecture
NMB48 members
Japanese YouTubers
Japanese female models